Ebonyi South (known historically as Afikpo Province) is one of three senatorial districts in Ebonyi State, Nigeria.

Local Governments and Constituencies

Local Government Areas
Ebonyi South is made up of five (5) Local Government Areas:
 Afikpo North
 Afikpo South (Edda)
 Ivo
 Ohaozara
 Onicha

Federal constituencies
The five Local Government Areas of Ebonyi South make up two Federal constituencies namely:
 Afikpo constituency - made up of Afikpo North & Afikpo South. Afikpo South is historically called Edda
 Ohanivo constituency - made up of Ohaozara, Onicha & Ivo. Ohanivo is an acronym gotten from creatively merging the names of the Local Governments that make up the constituency

History

Afikpo province in the newly created Nigeria
Ebonyi South produced the first Governor of the Eastern Region Dr. Francis Akanu Ibiam, first lady of Nigeria Lady Uche Azikiwe, Nigeria's first minister of Education Onyiba Aja Nwachuku and more .

Afikpo province under Abia
During the time Ebonyi south (known then as Afikpo province) was as under Abia state, the province produced the first Executive Governor of Abia State, Dr Ogbonnaya Onu who is an indigene of present day Ohaozara Local Government Area of Ebonyi State.

Also, ABIA is an acronym for the 4 most populous and industrialized places in the state at the time. These places were:
 A - Aba
 B - Bende
 I - Isuikwuato and
 A - Afikpo

Afikpo is now in Ebonyi State.

Afikpo province as Ebonyi South
Ebonyi South has produced one governor of Ebonyi state since its creation, in the person of Gov. Dave Umahi. The current senator representing Ebonyi South in the is Michael Ama Nnachi of the People's Democratic Party (PDP). And only this two, Afikpo Province has once produce the President of the Senate from 2000-2003 who is also once the Secretary to the Government of the Federation from 2011-2015, also PDP Presidential Aspirant in 2023 election in the Person of Sen. Anyim Pius Anyim, and so many others.

Higher institutions
 Mater School of Nursing, Afikpo
 Akanu Ibiam Federal Polytechnic, Unwana, Afikpo
 Federal College of Agriculture, Ishiagu, Ivo
 Ebonyi State University School of Nursing and Midwifery, Uburu, Ohaozara

Notable persons from Ebonyi South
 Anyim Pius Anyim, former Senate President of Nigeria and former Secretary General to the Federation
 Uche Azikiwe, pioneer First Lady of Nigeria and wife of Nigeria's First president Nnamdi Azikiwe
 Akanu Ibiam, first Governor of Nigeria's Eastern Region and predecessor of Chukwuemeka Ojukwu
 Samuel Eto'o, Cameroonian footballer, son of a migrant Afikpo father and Cameroonian mother
 Tekno, afropop singer, songwriter, record producer, performer
 Andy Chukwu, movie director, actor
 Ogbonnaya Onu, first Governor of Abia State, minister of Science & Technology
 Priscilla Ekwere Eleje, first female to have her signature appended on the Naira
 Patoranking, reggae and afropop singer, songwriter performer
 Sinach, gospel singer
 Chris Abani, Nigerian and American author
 Nwali Sylvester Ngwuta, Justice of the Supreme Court of Nigeria
 Igwe Aja Nwachukwu, former Nigeria Minister of Education from July 2007 to December 2008
 John Ogbu, Nigerian American anthropologist, "acting white" theorist
 Michael Nnachi Okoro, the former Bishop of the Roman Catholic Diocese of Abakaliki
 Michael Ama Nnachi, Senator representing Ebonyi South Senatorial District at the Nigerian 9th National Assembly
 Angela Okorie, actress
 Ogbonnaya Onu, first Executive Governor of Abia State, current Minister for Science and Technology
 Francis Otunta, Vice-Chancellor of Michael Okpara University of Agriculture, Umudike
 Anyimchukwu Ude, was Senator representing Ebonyi South constituency of Ebonyi State, Nigeria, in the Nigerian Senate from 29 May 2007 to 29 May 2011
 Dave Umahi, current Executive Governor of Ebonyi State
 Sonni Ogbuoji, senator representing Ebonyi South from May 2011 to May 2019

References

Politics of Ebonyi State
Senatorial districts in Nigeria